George Washington Jr. is a lost 1924 American silent comedy film directed by Malcolm St. Clair and written by Rex Taylor. It is based on the 1906 play George Washington Jr. by George M. Cohan. The film stars Wesley Barry, Gertrude Olmstead, Léon Bary, Heinie Conklin, Otis Harlan, and William Courtright. The film was released by Warner Bros. on February 2, 1924.

Plot
As described in a film magazine review, Count Gorfa, anarchist leader, steals the private records of a Senate Investigative Committee, the loss of which threatens the political fortunes of Senator Belgrave, whose daughter the Count wishes to wed. The Senator's son, the young George Washington Belgrave, and his friend Robert Lee Hopkins trail the anarchists. After many adventures and burlesques of historical fables, the documents are recovered and the Senator is saved.

Cast

Production
The role of the servant Eton Ham was played by Conklin in blackface.

References

External links

Advertising material with stills at www.silentfilmstillarchive.com

1924 films
1920s English-language films
Silent American comedy films
1924 comedy films
Warner Bros. films
Films directed by Malcolm St. Clair
American silent feature films
Lost American films
American black-and-white films
1924 lost films
Lost comedy films
1920s American films